J. William Lincoln (born October 27, 1940) is a former member of the Pennsylvania State Senate, serving from 1979 to 1994.

References

Democratic Party members of the Pennsylvania House of Representatives
Democratic Party Pennsylvania state senators
Living people
1940 births